This is a list of public art in Westminster, a district in the City of Westminster, London.
 
The area's main sculptural showcase is Parliament Square, conceived in the 1860s to improve the setting of the rebuilt Palace of Westminster, to ease traffic flow and as a site for commemorating politicians of note. Carlo Marochetti's statues of the engineers Robert Stephenson and Isambard Kingdom Brunel were initially considered for the square, but were rejected as not fitting in with the political theme. (They were ultimately erected outside Euston station and on the Victoria Embankment.) The square took on its present configuration in a refurbishment of 1949–50 by the architect George Grey Wornum, though four statues of twentieth-century figures have since been added.

Another two political memorials (one of which, the Buxton Memorial Fountain, was moved by Wornum from Parliament Square) and The Burghers of Calais, a work on an historical theme by Auguste Rodin, are to be found in Victoria Tower Gardens. As the memorials therein all touch on the theme of opposition to injustice, the gardens have been described by David Adjaye, the designer of a projected national Holocaust memorial for that location, as a "park of Britain's conscience".



Architectural sculpture of Westminster Abbey

Works formerly on display outdoors

See also
 Boadicea and Her Daughters 
 Burials and memorials in Westminster Abbey
 Field of Remembrance
 Parliamentary War Memorial
 Statue of Winston Churchill, Palace of Westminster
 Statue of Margaret Thatcher, Palace of Westminster

References

Bibliography

 

 

 

 

Westminster